Torranee Ni Nee Krai Krong is a 2012 Thai television drama that is aired on Channel 3 (Thailand). It starred Nadech Kugimiya and Urassaya Sperbund.

Plot
The story is about Athit and Darunee. Athit is an agriculture graduate. Instead of working as a government employee, he decides to do farming. So, his father sent him to work at his grandmother’s farm. Grandmother Daeng welcomed him because all her children do not want to do farming and left the land. Athit works hard and soon he becomes Daeng’s favorite grandchildren. Living in this land, not only hard work, but Athit has to deal with problems from Darunee, a high-school girl who is an adopted child of Daeng. Darunee is afraid that he will steal love from Daeng. Years later, Daeng passes away. In the will, she assigned Athit to take care of her property and be Darunee’s guardian.
Darunee is growing up and she started to understand Athit more. She knows that he puts a lot of effort to develop the land. They help each other to solve the problems on the farm. The relationship between them is getting better. However, the story does not end easily. They both do not know what their hearts need.

Cast
 Nadech Kugimiya (Barry) as Athit
 Urassaya Sperbund (Yaya) as Darunee
 Duangta Tungkamanee (Took) as Grandma Daeng
 Vivid bavornkiratikajorn (Tee) as Vethang
 Savitree Suttichanond (Beau) as Tunlayanee (Toon)
 Sumonthip Leuanguthai (Gubgib) as Wiyada
 Daraneenuch Pothipiti as Aunt Kaew
 Kluay Chernyim as Uncle KrengWayne Falconer as Pravate
 Chalermpol Tikampornwong (Jack) as Aueng
 Kanokpong Anurakjanyong as Pan
 Akarin Areerak (Ae Chernyim) as Tod
 Benjapol ChoeyArun (Golf) as Paitoon
 Rungthong Ruamthong as Wilailak
 Thansita Suwacharathanakit (Chompoo) as Thongprasri
 Sirinuch Petch-Urai as Kamma
 Santi Santiwechakul as Singthong
 Jaturong Korimas as Thongbai
 Pajaree Na Nakorn (poodle) as Tu
 Thiparin Yodthanasawas as Thongprasarn
 Nawaporn Boonmee as Thongprasom

Original Soundtrack

Awards and nominations

References

External links
 

Thai television soap operas
2010s Thai television series
2012 Thai television series debuts
2012 Thai television series endings
Channel 3 (Thailand) original programming